is an anime OVA series planned, drafted and designed by manga artist Kōsuke Fujishima. It is produced by Bandai Visual, Dentsu, Genco, Faith and Actas. The anime series spanned 6 episodes, as well as a feature movie, entitled éX-Driver: The Movie. The complete anime series, including the movie, were broadcast by the anime television network, Animax, across its respective networks around the world, including East Asia, Southeast Asia, South Asia and other regions.

Overview
In the distant future people no longer drive cars themselves, instead relying on AI (artificial intelligence) computers to drive their cars for them. But when these AI systems start losing control and running wild somebody has to stop them. éX-Drivers are the people who are able to operate the older mechanical non-AI dependent cars who chase down the AI cars and stop them.

A good amount of future and near future technology is featured throughout the series, including automated highway systems and A.I. (Artificial Intelligence) technology. Automated highway systems have been proposed as a solution to the traffic congestion problems.

In the series, anybody, regardless of age, can be an éX-Driver as long as they possess the required skills. For example, one of the main characters is only 13 years old and drives. The premise of the show is that there are éX-Drivers all over the world but the focus is on the team operating in Japan.

Cars used by éX-Drivers are marked with an éX-D decal. Typically an éX-Driver car would be an older mechanical type car and almost always would be rear-wheel drive with the exception of an AWD (4WD) Subaru Impreza WRC since éX-Drivers usually employ techniques such as drifting when bringing down runaway cars, which is much more difficult with front wheel drive (FWD) cars and in an all wheel drive (AWD) car.

Characters

Japanese voice actor: Yoko Asada
English voice actor: Philece Sampler
Cantonese voice actor: Celina Lam
Lisa's éx-Driver partner. She is a good-hearted girl who drives a Lotus Europa. She also tries to keep the team together when Sōichi and Lisa have an initial tense relationship. She maintains a good relationship between them. In relationship to Sōichi, she acts like a sister.

Japanese voice actor: Miki Nagasawa
English voice actor: Lia Sargent
Cantonese voice actor: Doris Lo
Lorna's éx-Driver partner. She drives a Subaru Impreza WRC in the first episode, but it is wrecked and has to be replaced with a Group 4 specification Lancia Stratos HF from the second episode onwards. She shuns Sōichi when he is selected to lead the team and also when he beats her in race. However, Lisa accepts him as the series progresses.

Japanese voice actor: Yumiko Kobayashi
English voice actor: Joshua Seth
Cantonese voice actor: Judy Lui
An extremely talented 12-year-old. He drives a Caterham Super Seven JPE, though he drives a modified Daihatsu Midget II on a racetrack. He soon becomes the team's leader. He initially has a tense relationship with Lisa, but they begin to gain their trust as the series progresses.

OVA

The OVA series consists of 6 episodes which are - except the last two - independent from each other.

 AI vs RECIPRO
 On And On
 No Problem
 Regulations of Love (éX-Rider)
 Crossroads
 The Last Mile

Movie
The éX-Driver anime series was also adapted into an anime movie sequel, entitled éX-Driver The Movie, which follows the adventures of Lisa, Lorna and Souichi as they participate in an international éX-Driver race held at Los Angeles. The movie also consisted of a special prequel to the series, entitled, éX-Driver - Nina & Rei Danger Zone, which served as the prologue for the movie, centering on the adventures of two of the former éX-Drivers, Nina Thunder and Rei Kazama. Three short bonus shorts were also featured with the movie, featuring Lisa, Lorna and Souichi in events set just before where the movie takes off. These bonus shorts are done in comedic style, mainly with camera pans and zooms on still images:

Onsen—set in a hot spring
Race Queen—set in the éX-Driver Base
Airport—set in the Airport on their way to Los Angeles

Staff
Planning, original creator, original character concept: Kōsuke Fujishima
Series composition and script: Shinjo Fujita
éX-Car design: Shunji Murata
Mecha design: Takeshi Takakura, Hidefumi Kimura (ep.1)
Music: JAM Project, Hikaru Nanase
Director: Jun Kawagoe

External links

2000 anime OVAs
2002 anime films
2002 anime OVAs
Japanese auto racing films
Animated films about auto racing
Actas
Anime with original screenplays
Anime Works
Bandai Namco franchises
Geneon USA
Kōsuke Fujishima
Fictional motorsports in anime and manga
Science fiction anime and manga
Films directed by Akira Nishimori